"Natural One" is a song by the band The Folk Implosion.

The song was written by Folk Implosion's lead member Lou Barlow and Orbit bassist Wally Gagel, who also produced the song.

It was released as a single in 1995, and was featured on the soundtrack to the Larry Clark film Kids, but does not appear in the film itself. The song peaked at No.29 on the Billboard Hot 100, No.4 on the Billboard Modern Rock Tracks chart, No.20 on the Billboard Mainstream Rock Tracks chart and No.45 in the UK Singles Chart.

It was also used as the theme song for AMC Network's "Long Live Cool" promos.

There was also an a capella version of this song.

In 2013, the band Shearwater covered the song on their all-covers album, Fellow Travelers.

It was also used in 2016's The People v. O. J. Simpson: American Crime Story, episode eight "A Jury in Jail."

Track listings
London Records released a promotional single/ep on CD and cassette to promote the film and soundtrack.

US CD/Cassette single

 "Natural One" 3:10
 "Cabride" 2:54

UK release

 "Natural One" 3:10
 "Cabride" 2:54
 "Nothing Gonna Stop" 4:11
 "Simean Groove" 3:30

Australian and US EP releases

 "Natural One"
 "Nothing Gonna Stop the Flow"
 "Cabride"
 "Their Theme"
 "Nasa Theme"

Music Video
An accompanying music video was released and achieved MTVBuzzBin status. The AV Club's Annie Zaleski describes the promotional clip as "a cross between a National Geographic special on nature and an art school film."

References

External links
 The Folk Implosion discography
 Folk Implosion "Natural One" music video

1995 singles
1995 songs
London Records singles
PolyGram singles
Songs written by Wally Gagel